The Kokoda glass perchlet (Tetracentrum caudovittatus) is a species of fish in the family Ambassidae. It is endemic to Papua New Guinea.

References

Tetracentrum
Freshwater fish of Papua New Guinea
Fish described in 1935
Taxonomy articles created by Polbot
Endemic fauna of Papua New Guinea